In biology, the BBCH-scale for leafy vegetables forming heads describes the phenological development of leafy vegetables forming heads, such as cabbage, chinese cabbage, lettuce and endive, using the BBCH-scale.

The phenological growth stages and BBCH-identification keys of leafy vegetables forming heads are:

References

External links
A downloadable version of the BBCH Scales

BBCH-scale